Mayre or Mayré may refer to:
 3870 Mayré, a main-belt asteroid, named after the discoverer's daughter

 Mayre Griffiths (Trot) name of a fictional character in The Wizard of Oz
 Mayré Martínez, Venezuelan pop singer

See also
 Mayres (disambiguation)